Daniel Lamar Roberts (born August 5, 1980) is an American mixed martial artist who last competed in 2015. A professional since 2007, he is a veteran of the UFC, Pancrase, Titan FC, and Legacy FC.

Background
Roberts is a graduate of Bacone College in Muskogee, Oklahoma, where he majored in Business Administration. At Bacone College, Roberts was a standout athlete and an NAIA All-American wrestler. Roberts also has 12 years of jiu-jitsu experience and is proficient in Karate, Judo and Boxing.

He recently moved out to California to train with Gilbert Melendez and his team, the Skrap Pack. He also trains at Fairtex Muay Thai in San Francisco.

Mixed martial arts career

Early career
Roberts made his professional debut in 2007, and moved to 9-0 before being signed by the UFC.

Ultimate Fighting Championship
Roberts signed a four-fight deal with the UFC in March 2010. He made his debut on short notice, filling in for an injured Anthony Johnson to fight John Howard at UFC Live: Vera vs. Jones. After an exciting grappling affair in the first two minutes, Howard delivered a punch that knocked Roberts unconscious.

Roberts was expected to fight Julio Paulino at UFC 116, but Paulino was forced from the card with an injury. Roberts instead fought veteran Forrest Petz. Roberts won the fight via split decision.

Roberts fought and quickly defeated Mike Guymon on October 23, 2010 at UFC 121. The fight barely passed the minute mark in the first round before Roberts applied an anaconda choke, and earned the submission win. His submission win also earned him the 'Submission of the Night' honors.

On January 1, 2011 at UFC 125, Roberts fought Greg Soto and after some early back-and-forth grappling, Roberts grabbed Soto's arm in a kimura, took top position and forced the tapout with just over a minute left in the opening round.

Roberts then faced fellow up-and-comer, Claude Patrick, on April 30, 2011 at UFC 129. On the judges scorecards, Roberts lost two of the three rounds, ultimately losing the fight via unanimous decision (29–28, 29–28, 29–28).

When injuries caused shuffling at UFC on Versus 4, taking place June 26, 2011, Roberts stepped in on very short notice to fight Rich Attonito. Roberts lost the fight via unanimous decision (29–27, 30–27, 29–28).

Roberts was expected to face TJ Waldburger on September 17, 2011 at UFC Fight Night 25.  However, he had to pull out due to injury and was replaced by Mike Stumpf.

Roberts next faced Charlie Brenneman on January 20, 2012 at UFC on FX: Guillard vs. Miller.  He lost the fight via unanimous decision. He was later released from the promotion following three consecutive losses.

Post-UFC career
In his first fight after his UFC release, Roberts would face Nuri Shakir at Freedom Fight MMA on October 27, 2012. He won the fight via rear-naked choke submission in the second round. Roberts would then get his second straight submission win, when he submitted UFC veteran Brian Foster via rear-naked choke at Combat MMA on May 18, 2013.

He then faced Justin Baesman at War MMA 1 on June 22, 2013. He lost the fight via split decision.

After a near one-year hiatus, Roberts faced Brock Jardine at  Titan FC 28: Brilz vs. Davis on May 16, 2014. He won the fight via split decision.

Personal life
A week before his win at UFC 125, Roberts found out he was a father to a daughter named Gabrielle.

Championships and accomplishments
Ultimate Fighting Championship
Submission of the Night (One time) vs. Mike Guymon

Mixed martial arts record

|-
| Loss
|align=center| 15–7
| Akihiro Murayama
| Decision (split)
| Pancrase: 266
| 
|align=center| 3
|align=center| 5:00
|Tokyo, Japan
|
|-
| Loss
|align=center| 15–6
| Derrick Krantz
| Submission (Von Flue choke)
| Legacy FC 35
| 
|align=center|1
|align=center|2:49
|Tulsa, Oklahoma, United States
|
|-
| Win
|align=center| 15–5
| Brock Jardine
| Decision (split)
|  Titan FC 28: Brilz vs. Davis
| 
|align=center|3
|align=center|5:00
|Newkirk, Oklahoma, United States
|
|-
|  Loss
|align=center| 14–5
|Justin Baesman
|Decision (split)
|War MMA 1
|
|align=center| 3
|align=center| 5:00
|Stockton, California, United States
|
|-
| Win
|align=center| 14–4
| Brian Foster
| Submission (rear-naked choke)
| Combat MMA
| 
|align=center| 1
|align=center| 1:29
|Tulsa, Oklahoma, United States
|
|-
| Win
|align=center| 13–4
| Nuri Shakir
| Submission (rear-naked choke)
| Freedom Fight MMA
| 
|align=center| 2
|align=center| 2:55
|Sudbury, Ontario, Canada
|Catchweight (180 lbs) bout.
|-
| Loss
|align=center| 12–4
| Charlie Brenneman
| Decision (unanimous)
| UFC on FX: Guillard vs. Miller
| 
|align=center| 3
|align=center| 5:00
|Nashville, Tennessee, United States
| 
|-
| Loss
|align=center| 12–3
| Rich Attonito
| Decision (unanimous)
| UFC Live: Kongo vs. Barry
| 
|align=center| 3
|align=center| 5:00
|Pittsburgh, Pennsylvania, United States
| 
|-
| Loss
|align=center| 12–2
| Claude Patrick
| Decision (unanimous)
| UFC 129
| 
|align=center| 3
|align=center| 5:00
|Toronto, Ontario, Canada
| 
|-
| Win
|align=center| 12–1
| Greg Soto
| Submission (kimura)
| UFC 125
| 
|align=center| 1
|align=center| 3:45
|Las Vegas, Nevada, United States
| 
|-
| Win
|align=center| 11–1
| Mike Guymon
| Submission (anaconda choke)
| UFC 121
| 
|align=center| 1
|align=center| 1:13
|Anaheim, California, United States
| 
|-
| Win
|align=center| 10–1
| Forrest Petz
| Decision (split)
| UFC 116
| 
|align=center| 3
|align=center| 5:00
|Las Vegas, Nevada, United States
| 
|-
| Loss
|align=center| 9–1
| John Howard
| KO (punch)
| UFC Live: Vera vs. Jones
| 
|align=center| 1
|align=center| 2:01
|Broomfield, Colorado, United States
| 
|-
| Win
|align=center| 9–0
| Anthony Macias
| TKO (submission to punches)
| XFL: New Year's Revolution
| 
|align=center| 1
|align=center| 4:00
|Tulsa, Oklahoma, United States
| 
|-
| Win
|align=center| 8–0
| Mike Jackson
| Submission (rear-naked choke)
| Bricktown Brawl 2
| 
|align=center| 1
|align=center| 1:33
|Oklahoma City, Oklahoma, United States
| 
|-
| Win
|align=center| 7–0
| Jeff Lindsay
| TKO (submission to punches)
| Bricktown Brawl 1
| 
|align=center| 1
|align=center| 1:14
|Oklahoma City, Oklahoma, United States
| 
|-
| Win
|align=center| 6–0
| Gabriel Vasquez
| Submission (kimura)
| C3 Fights
| 
|align=center| 1
|align=center| 1:37
|Clinton, Oklahoma, United States
| 
|-
| Win
|align=center| 5–0
| Levi Avera
| Submission (kimura)
| Freestyle Cage Fighting
| 
|align=center| 2
|align=center| 2:45
|Oklahoma City, Oklahoma, United States
| 
|-
| Win
|align=center| 4–0
| Akira Ninjo
| Decision (unanimous)
| Extreme Fighting League
| 
|align=center| 3
|align=center| 4:00
|Tulsa, Oklahoma, United States
| 
|-
| Win
|align=center| 3–0
| Danny Grass
| Submission (rear-naked choke)
| Extreme Fighting League
| 
|align=center| 1
|align=center| 0:56
|Miami, Oklahoma, United States
| 
|-
| Win
|align=center| 2–0
| Jeremy Michael
| Submission (arm-triangle choke)
| Extreme Fighting League
| 
|align=center| 1
|align=center| 1:20
|Catoosa, Oklahoma, United States
| 
|-
| Win
|align=center| 1–0
| Brandon Gaines
| Decision (split)
| Extreme Fighting League
| 
|align=center| 3
|align=center| N/A
|Oklahoma, United States
|

References

External links

Official UFC Profile

1980 births
Living people
Sportspeople from Rockford, Illinois
American male mixed martial artists
Mixed martial artists utilizing judo
Mixed martial artists utilizing boxing
Mixed martial artists utilizing Brazilian jiu-jitsu
Mixed martial artists utilizing karate
Mixed martial artists utilizing collegiate wrestling
American practitioners of Brazilian jiu-jitsu
American male judoka
American male karateka
Bacone College alumni
Bacone Warriors wrestlers
Sportspeople from the San Francisco Bay Area
Ultimate Fighting Championship male fighters